The Chicago Art Book Fair (CABF) is an annual art fair held in Chicago, Illinois, United States. The fair focuses on art books and small press publishing featuring independent artists, publishers, presses and printmakers. The genre of materials represented ranges from traditional artist's book publishers and printing to comics, zines and alternative press materials. The fair was founded by the artists Aay Preston-Myint and Alexander Valentine. 

It has been held annually in Chicago since 2017. The first three fairs were held in November at the Chicago Athletic Association in downtown Chicago.

References

 
Festivals in Chicago
Arts festivals in the United States
Contemporary art fairs
2017 establishments in Illinois
Festivals established in 2017